The 18th European Women's Artistic Gymnastics Championships were held in Piraeus, Greece, at Peace and Friendship Stadium.

Medalists 

1990
European Artistic Gymnastics Championships
1990 in European sport
Sports competitions in Athens
International gymnastics competitions hosted by Greece
1990 in Greek sport
1990 in Greek women's sport